Al-Khawarnaq Sport Club, is an Iraqi football team based in Al-Manathera District, Al-Najaf, that plays in the Iraq Division Two.

History
Al-Khawarnaq team played in the Iraq Division One in the 2004-05 season, but was eliminated from the Group Stage after collecting 7 points, from 1 win, 4 draws and 7 losses.

Stadium
In 2009, the Ministry of Youth and Sports began working on rehabilitating and developing Al-Khawarnaq Stadium with an amount of 3 billion IQD, but the work was delayed and many technical irregularities and problems appeared.

Managerial history
 Alwan Mana
 Mohammed Younes

See also
 1998–99 Iraq FA Cup

References

External links
 Al-Khawarnaq SC on Goalzz.com
 Iraq Clubs- Foundation Dates

1973 establishments in Iraq
Association football clubs established in 1973
Football clubs in Najaf